Tigalda Island is one of the Krenitzin Islands, a subgroup of the Fox Islands in the eastern Aleutian Islands, Alaska. Tigalda is an Aleut name published by Captain Lutke (1836). It was called "Kagalga" by Captain Lt. Krenitzin and Lt. Levashev (1768). Tigalda Bay is situated on the north side of Tigalda. Father Veniaminov (1840) reported the existence of an Aleut village, which he called "Tigaldinskoe", of 91 people in 1833.

References

Krenitzin Islands
Uninhabited islands of Alaska
Islands of Alaska
Islands of Aleutians East Borough, Alaska